Sharpness Point is a small headland projecting into the North Sea at Tynemouth, Tyne and Wear. The O.S. grid reference is NZ371699.

It is the only promontory in Northumberland with the -ness suffix. The word ness is a geographical term for a promontory, cape or headland, a strip of land projecting into a body of water, and derives from the Old English næs, meaning  headland (related to Old Norse nes).

See also
Geordie dialect words

Headlands of England
Tynemouth
Landforms of Tyne and Wear